Antoine Philibert Albert Bailly (1 March 1605 – 3 April 1691) was a Savoyard clergyman who was bishop of Aosta from 1659 until his death.

Biography 

Born in 1605 to Barthélémy Balli and Béatrix de Loziano, he studied with the Jesuites of Chambéry and after he moved to Turin, where he became secretary of Victor Amadeus I, Duke of Savoy. He became a Barnabite priest in 1633.

He was ordained as a bishop in March 1659.

Although not a native of the Aosta Valley, Bailly remains, as a devoted defender of local freedoms, a cultural and historical figure of the valley. He is considered by Lin Colliard as "the best and the most prolific Valdôtain writer of the time" and Rosanna Gorris stated that "the most important writer of Valdôtain 17th century literature is certainly Albert Bailly, bishop of Aosta".

References

Bibliography

External links
Profile of Mons. Bailly www.catholic-hierarchy.org 
Official Page of diocese of Aosta

Bishops of Aosta
People from Savoie
Barnabites
1605 births
1691 deaths